A plant cutting is a piece of a plant that is used in horticulture for vegetative (asexual) propagation. A piece of the stem or root of the source plant is placed in a suitable medium such as moist soil. If the conditions are suitable, the plant piece will begin to grow as a new plant independent of the parent, a process known as striking. A stem cutting produces new roots, and a root cutting produces new stems. Some plants can be grown from leaf pieces, called leaf cuttings, which produce both stems and roots. The scions used in grafting are also called cuttings.

Propagating plants from cuttings is an ancient form of cloning. There are several advantages of cuttings, mainly that the produced offspring are practically clones of their parent plants. If a plant has favorable traits, it can continue to pass down its advantageous genetic information to its offspring. This is especially economically advantageous as it allows commercial growers to clone a certain plant to ensure consistency throughout their crops.

Evolutionary advantage: Succulents 
Cuttings are used as a method of asexual reproduction in succulent horticulture, commonly referred to as vegetative reproduction. A cutting can also be referred to as a propagule. Succulents have evolved with the ability to use adventitious root formation in reproduction to increase fitness in stressful environments. Succulents grow in shallow soils, rocky soils, and desert soils. Seedlings from sexual reproduction have a low survival rate; however, plantlets from the excised stem cuttings and leaf cuttings, broken off in the natural environment, are more successful. Cuttings have both water and carbon stored and available, which are resources needed for plant establishment. The detached part of the plant remains physiologically active, allowing mitotic activity and new root structures to form for water and nutrient uptake. Asexual reproduction of plants is also evolutionarily advantageous as it allows plantlets to be better suited to their environment through retention of epigenetic memory, heritable patterns of phenotypic differences that are not due to changes in DNA but rather histone modification and DNA methylation. Epigenetic memory is heritable through mitosis, and thus advantageous stress response priming is retained in plantlets from excised stem.

Physiology 
Adventitious root formation refers to roots that form from any structure of a plant that is not a root; these roots can form as part of normal development or due to a stress response. Adventitious root formation from the excised stem cutting is a wound response.

At a molecular level when a cutting is first excised at the stem there is an immediate increase in jasmonic acid, known to be necessary for adventitious root formation. When the cutting is excised from the original root system the root inhibiting hormones, cytokinin and strigolactone, which are made in the root and transported to the stem, decrease in concentration. Polyphenol degradation decreases, increasing auxin concentration. The increased auxin concentration increases nitric oxide concentration which initiates root formation through a MAPK signal cascade and a cGMP-dependent pathway that both regulate mitotic division and are both necessary for the initiation of adventitious root formation. The root primordia form from cambial cells in the stem. In propagation of detached succulent leaves and leaf cuttings, the root primordia typically emerges from the basal callous tissue after the leaf primordia emerges.

It was known as early as 1935 that when indolyl-3-acetic acid (IAA), also known as auxin, is applied to the stem of root cuttings, there is an increase in the average number of adventitious roots compared to cuttings that are not treated. Researchers also applied this compound to stems without leaves that normally would not have any root formation and found that auxin induced root formation, thus determining auxin is necessary for root formation. Identification of this hormone has been important to industries that rely on vegetative propagation, as it is sometimes applied to fresh cuttings to stimulate root growth.

Technique 

Some plants form roots much more easily than others. Stem cuttings from woody plants are treated differently, depending on the maturity of the wood:
Softwood cuttings come from stems that are rapidly expanding, with young leaves. In many species, such cuttings form roots relatively easily.
Semi-hardwood cuttings come from stems that have completed elongation growth and have mature leaves.
Hardwood cuttings come from fully matured stems, and are often propagated while dormant.

Most plant cuttings are stem pieces, and have no root system of their own,  and are therefore likely to die from dehydration if the proper conditions are not met. They require a moist medium, which, however, cannot be too wet lest the cutting rot. A number of media are used in this process, including but not limited to soil, perlite, vermiculite, coir, rock wool, expanded clay pellets, and even water given the right conditions. Most succulent cuttings can be left in open air until the cut surface dries, which may improve root formation when the cutting is later planted.

In temperate countries, stem cuttings may be taken of soft (green or semi-ripe) wood and hard wood, which have specific differences in practice. Certain conditions lead to more favorable outcomes for cuttings; timing, size, location on the plant, and amount of foliage are all important. Stem cuttings of young wood should be taken in spring from the upper branches, while cuttings of hardened wood should be taken in winter from the lower branches. Soft wood cuttings do best when about two thirds of the foliage are removed, while hard wood stem cuttings need complete foliage removal. The cut needs to be done either immediately below a node, or up to 1/2 inch below a node.

Besides placing the cuttings directly into soil, it is also possible to root cuttings in water. The water needs to be replaced often, to prevent bacteria buildup and the possibility of root rot. It also requires enough oxygen in the water for the same reason. A moist atmosphere (use of plastic sheeting) is hence not needed with this technique.

The environment for softwood and semi-hardwood cuttings is generally kept humid—often attained by placing the cuttings under a plastic sheet or in another confined space where the air can be kept moist—and in partial shade to prevent the cutting from drying out. Cuttings in the medium are typically watered with a fine mist to avoid disturbing the plants. Following the initial watering, the aim is to keep the soil moist but not wet or waterlogged; the medium is allowed to almost dry out before misting again.

A rooting hormone may be administered to "encourage" growth and can increase the success rate of plant growth. Though not essential, several compounds may be used to promote the formation of roots through the signaling activity of plant hormone auxins. Among the commonly used chemicals is indole-3-butyric acid (IBA) used as a powder, liquid solution, or gel. This compound is applied either to the cut tip of the cutting or as a foliar spray. Rooting hormone can be manufactured naturally, such as soaking the yellow-tipped shoots of a weeping willow tree in water, or by preparing a tea from the bark of a willow tree. Shoots or bark do better when soaked for 24 hours prior to using. The extract obtained from the crushing of leaves and bulbs of coco-grass (Cyperus rotundus) is used as an excellent rooting of cuttings and seedlings of various plant species. Honey, though it does not contain any plant hormones, can also aid in rooting success through its natural antiseptic and antifungal properties. Cinnamon or an Aspirin tablet in water can also aid the rooting process.

Types 

Many vegetative parts of a plant can be used. The most common methods are:
 Stem cuttings, in which a piece of stem is part buried in the soil, including at least one leaf node. The cutting is able to produce new roots, usually at the node.
 Root cuttings, in which a section of root is buried just below the soil surface, and produces new shoots.
 Scion cuttings are used in grafting.
 Leaf cuttings, in which a leaf is placed on moist soil. These have to develop both new stems and new roots. Some leaves will produce one plant at the base of the leaf. In some species, multiple new plants can be produced at many places on one leaf, and these can be induced by cutting the leaf veins. The leaf cutting method is commonly used with succulents.

Although some species, such as willow, blackberry and pelargoniums can be grown simply by placing a cutting into moist ground, the majority of species require more attention. Most species require humid, warm, partially shaded conditions to strike, thus requiring the approach above to be followed. Particularly difficult species may need cool air above and warm soil. In addition, with many more difficult cuttings, one should use the type of cutting that has the most chance of success with that particular plant species.

Improving results 

There are ways of improving the growth of stem cutting propagations. Intensifying light allows cuttings to root and sprout faster, though the heat thus generated could cause the propagation material distress. Azalea cuttings can be mildly heated in water to disinfect it from the fungus pathogen Rhizoctonia, and this could potentially be used for other plants.

Soil 
Depending on the type of cutting (i.e. tree, shrub, succulent, cacti) different potting soil mixes can be used. Many commercial companies sell medium specifically for growing cuttings.

Air and soil humidity 
Although several options can be used here, usually plastic is used to cover the softwood and semi-hardwood cuttings. The soil below the trays (to increase air moisture) and the soil in the tray themselves is kept moist but not waterlogged (=completely saturated). The trays the cuttings sit in are best placed on stones to prevent capillary action (as this can keep the soil inside the trays too wet). Soil in the trays should be kept at 85 to 95% saturation. Automated (overhead) misting systems, boom systems or fog systems can be used in greenhouses. A typical misting frequency during sticking and callusing includes misting for 5–8 seconds every 5–10 minutes over a 24-hour period. After 3 to 4 days, misting is reduced to 3–5 seconds every 10–20 minutes during the day and less frequently at night. When roots become visible (stage 3) misting can be reduced, and by stage 4 (toning), little to no misting should be done (by day 10 to 14 for most species). When using plastic tents, far less misting is needed (once or twice a day). The greenhouse or cold frame should be ventilated once in a while to prevent formation of molds (manually).

Air and soil temperature 
Air temperature for softwood and semi-hardwood cuttings is optimal at around 70° Fahrenheit (21,1° Celsius) but temperatures as low as 55° Fahrenheit (12,7° Celsius) are acceptable. Heating the air above 75° Fahrenheit (23,8° Celsius) stimulates the growth of pathogens. Ventilating (manually or through automatic window openers) the greenhouse or cold frame can lower the air temperature. Automated thermostat systems can also be used in greenhouses to keep the heat at a specific temperature. Bottom heating (soil) tends to be ideal for root initiation since growing media temperature is best maintained at 20-22° Celsius.

Sunlight
Whereas cuttings need to be kept warm and some amount of light needs to be provided, it needs to be kept out of direct sunlight. Some ways to accomplish this include using white wash, semi-white plastic, retractible shade curtains (which can be deployed if the sun temporarily pierces through), ...
Optimum light levels are around 120 to 200 μmol/m2s at the first stage (sticking). Once callus has been formed (stage 2: callusing) and roots start to form and take up water (stage 3: root development phase), light intensity levels can be gradually increased (to 200 to 800 μmol/m2s). Most propagators find that 5 to 10 moles per day (i.e. observed using a Daily Light Integral sensor) will result in a consistent rooting and growth

Plant species that allow propagation from cuttings
Plants which can be propagated from stem, leaf and/or tip cuttings include:

 
 

African violet – tip or leaf cutting
Aglaonema – tip cuttings
Aeonium – stem cuttings
Aizoaceae – stem and tip cuttings
Alternanthera – stem cuttings
Aucuba – stem cuttings
Azalea – stem cuttings
Baby's tears – stem cuttings
Begonia – tip, leaf and stem cuttings
Blackberries – stem cuttings
Brugmansia – stem cuttings
Bryophyllum – leaf or cuttings
Cactus – tip cuttings
Calathea – tip cuttings
Callisia – stem cuttings
Cannabis – stem and tip cuttings
Christmas cactus – tip cuttings
Citrus – tip cuttings
Cochliasanthus – stem cuttings
Coleus – tip cuttings
Cordyline – tip or stem cuttings
Cotyledon – stem or leaf cuttings
Crepe myrtle – stem cuttings
Curio repens – stem or leaf cuttings
Common purslane – stem cuttings
Croton – tip cuttings
Crassula – stem or leaf cuttings
Dieffenbachia – tip cuttings
Dracaena – stem cuttings
Dudleya – leaf or stem cuttings
Delairea – stem cuttings
Echeveria – leaf cuttings
Euphorbia – leaf or steam cuttings
Ficus – tip or stem cuttings
Forsythia – stem cuttings
Geranium – tip cuttings
Golden pothos – tip or stem cuttings
Gibasis – stem cuttings
Grape ivy – tip cuttings or stem cuttings
Graptopetalum – leaf or stem cuttings
Grevillea – stem cuttings
Haworthia – leaf or stem cuttings
Hedera – stem cuttings
Hibiscus – stem cuttings
Hoya – tip cuttings
Hops – stem cuttings
Impatiens – tip cuttings
Ipomoea – stem cuttings
Jasmine – stem cutting
Kalanchoe – leaf or stem cuttings
Kleinia – stem cutting
Kumquat – stem cutting
Lemon balm – stem cuttings
Maranta – tip cuttings
Marjoram – stem cuttings
Manioc (cassava)  – stem cuttings
Monstera – tip cuttings
Moringa - Stem cuttings
Mint – stem cuttings
Morus – stem cuttings
Oleander  – stem cuttings
Oregano – stem cuttings
Othonna capensis – stem cuttings
Parthenocissus – stem cuttings
Parsley – stem cuttings
Pelargonium – tip cuttings
Peperomia – tip or leaf cuttings
Philodendron – tip and stem cuttings
Pilea cadierei – tip cuttings
Pineapple – stem cuttings
Plectranthus – stem cuttings
Podocarpus – tip cuttings
Poinsettia – stem cuttings
Portulacaria – stem cuttings
Plum – stem cuttings
Poplar – stem cuttings
Red-hot cat tail – stem cuttings
Resurrection plant – tip cuttings
Rosemary – stem cuttings
Sage – stem cuttings
Sansevieria – leaf cuttings
Sedum – leaf cuttings
Schefflera – stem or stem cuttings
Senecio angulatus – stem cuttings
Senecio crassissimus  – stem or tip cuttings
Senecio haworthii – stem or tip cuttings
Sugar cane – stem cuttings
Syngonium – stem cuttings
String of hearts – stem cuttings
Syringa – stem cuttings
Tea – stem cuttings
Shrimp plant  – tip cuttings
Thyme – stem cuttings
Thunbergia – stem cuttings
Tetradenia riparia – stem cuttings
Tradescantia – stem cuttings
Vanilla – stem cuttings
Verbena – stem cuttings
Willow – stem cutting
Vitis – stem cuttings, grafting, aerial layering
Yucca – stem cuttings
To note, some plants listed above, such as Coleus, Maranta, Nerium and Golden Pothos, among others, may require water for them to root before they can be transplanted to soil.

In popular culture
The poet Theodore Roethke wrote about plant cuttings and root growth behavior in his poems "Cuttings" and "Cuttings (Later)"  found in his book The Lost Son: And Other Poems.

See also 
 Division (horticulture)
 Grafting
 Potting soil
 Propagule
 Propagation of grapevines
 Hemerochory

References

External links 
 
 

Horticulture
Plant reproduction
Asexual reproduction
Cloning